Keith Worsley (fourth ¼ 1952) is an English former professional rugby league footballer who played in the 1970s and 1980s.

Background
Keith Worsley's birth was registered in Pontefract district, West Riding of Yorkshire.

Playing career

County honours
Keith Worsley won caps playing , i.e. number 3 for Yorkshire while at Castleford in the 32-18 victory over Lancashire at Castleford's stadium on 11 October 1972, and the 20-7 victory over Lancashire at Leeds' stadium on 17 January 1973.

County Cup Final appearances
Keith Worsley played left-, i.e. number 4, in Castleford's 7-11 defeat by Hull Kingston Rovers in the 1971 Yorkshire County Cup Final during the 1971–72 season at Belle Vue, Wakefield on Saturday 21 August 1971.

References

External links
Keith Worsley Memory Box Search at archive.castigersheritage.com

1952 births
Living people
Castleford Tigers players
English rugby league players
Rugby league fullbacks
Rugby league players from Pontefract
York Wasps players
Yorkshire rugby league team players